Víctor Figueroa (born 29 August 1956) is an Argentine biathlete. He competed in the 20 km individual event at the 1984 Winter Olympics.

References

1956 births
Living people
Argentine male biathletes
Olympic biathletes of Argentina
Biathletes at the 1984 Winter Olympics
Sportspeople from Mendoza, Argentina